The Beriev Be-8 (USAF/DoD reporting name "Type 33", NATO reporting name "Mole"), was built by the Soviet Beriev OKB in 1947. It was a passenger/liaison amphibian aircraft with a layout similar to the Be-4 but substantially larger and heavier. It was a single engined parasol winged aircraft, with the wing installed on a thin pylon and a pair of short struts. Compared to the Be-4, the Be-8 was equipped with retractable landing gear, with cockpit and passenger cabins heated by an engine exhaust heat exchanger. The Be-8 was intended as a civil aircraft and carried no armament. First flight was on 3 December 1947, demonstrating good performance and of the two prototypes, one was demonstrated during the 1951 Soviet Aviation Day at Tushino.

One of Be-8 was equipped with hydrofoils, developed at TsAGI. These "Underwater Wings" were installed on landing gear struts and raised the aircraft above the water, well before the aerodynamic lift could support the aircraft. As a result, takeoff was much easier and imposed less punishment on the hull from the waves. 
Despite being very effective during take-off, the hydrofoils resulted in increased drag and a reduction in maximum airspeed. Construction of retractable hydrofoils was not ready, and the concept did not find practical applications.

Specifications (Be-8)

References

 Gunston, Bill. The Osprey Encyclopedia of Russian Aircraft 1875–1995. London: Osprey, 1995. .
 

Be-0008
Single-engined tractor aircraft
Parasol-wing aircraft
Flying boats
1940s Soviet civil utility aircraft
Amphibious aircraft
Aircraft first flown in 1947